Arne Sandstø (born 21 October 1966) is a Norwegian football manager and former player.

Sandstø made seven appearances in Germany's 2. Bundesliga for Tennis Borussia Berlin during his playing career.

Managerial career 
Under Sandstø's leadership Odd Grenland performed consistently in the top flight until the club was relegated in 2007. Sandstø also led Odd to their first Norwegian cup victory in 69 years, in 2000. 

Since 2008, Sandstø has been the head coach of clubs at the second level of Norwegian football. In 2008, he led IK Start to promotion. In 2010, he led Løv-Ham, who were struggling financially, to a surprising spot in the play-offs. In both 2011 and 2012, he led Sandefjord Fotball to third place and narrowly missed promotion. In 2016, he led FK Jerv to a third place and a spot in the play-offs, which is the club's best league performance in history.

References

External links 
 

1956 births
Living people
Footballers from Bergen
Norwegian footballers
Association football midfielders
2. Bundesliga players
SK Brann players
Hertha BSC players
Tennis Borussia Berlin players
Lillestrøm SK players
Odds BK players
Norwegian football managers
Odds BK managers
IK Start managers
Sandefjord Fotball managers
Norwegian expatriate footballers
Expatriate footballers in Germany
Norwegian expatriate sportspeople in Germany
Notodden FK managers
Eliteserien managers
FK Jerv managers